Cameroon competed in the Summer Olympic Games for the first time at the 1964 Summer Olympics in Tokyo, Japan. David Njitock was the lone representative for Cameroon, placing 7th in the 100 meter, and 5th in the 200 meter runs.

References
Official Olympic Reports

Nations at the 1964 Summer Olympics
1964
1964 in Cameroonian sport